Paul Watson (born 20 December 1990) is a Scottish professional footballer who plays as a centre back for Scottish League One club Falkirk.

Career

Livingston
Former Livingston manager Gary Bollan signed Watson from Ipswich Town in August 2009. He helped the club win the Scottish Third Division, in his first season at Almondvale. The next season, he helped Livingston win the Scottish Second Division title by making 33 appearances for the West Lothian club. Watson subsequently signed a new two-year contract, keeping him at the club until the summer of 2013.

Raith Rovers
Watson signed for Raith Rovers on 17 July 2013.

On 12 June 2015, it was confirmed that Watson would not be renewing his contract with the club.

Falkirk
On 19 July 2015, it was announced that Watson had joined Falkirk. He was released by Falkirk at the end of the 2017–18 season.

Dundee United
On 20 July 2018, Watson signed for Dundee United, agreeing a two-year contract. After winning the Scottish Championship with them in the 2019–20 season, Watson was released by United at the end of COVID-19-shortened season.

Dunfermline Athletic
On 29 June 2020, Watson was announced as Dunfermline Athletic's first summer signing, joining the Scottish Championship side on a two-year deal.

On 19 October 2021, Watson left Dunfermline Athletic via mutual consent.

Return to Falkirk

On 24 January 2022, Watson returned to Falkirk on an 18-month contract.

Career statistics

Honours
Livingston
Scottish Third Division: 2009–10
Scottish Second Division: 2010–11
Raith Rovers
Scottish Challenge Cup: 2013–14 
Dundee United
Scottish Championship: 2019–20

References

External links

1990 births
Living people
Scottish Football League players
Livingston F.C. players
Association football defenders
Footballers from Edinburgh
Scottish footballers
Ipswich Town F.C. players
Raith Rovers F.C. players
Lothian Thistle Hutchison Vale F.C. players
Scottish Professional Football League players
Falkirk F.C. players
Dundee United F.C. players
Dunfermline Athletic F.C. players